KACI-FM (93.5 MHz) is a radio station broadcasting classic hits. Licensed to The Dalles, Oregon, United States.  The station is currently owned by Bicoastal Media and the broadcast license is held by Bicoastal Media Licenses IV, LLC.

History
KACI-FM came on the air in 1985 at 97.7 FM.  The format was Top 40 until late 1993, when it switched to JRN's satellite-fed Oldies, currently the music format is "hits from the 60', 70's & 80's"  KACI-FM was simulcast with AM 1300 KACI for many years but went to a news and talk radio format.  In 2012, it moved to its current tower and frequency; 93.5 FM.

References

External links

ACI-FM
Classic hits radio stations in the United States
The Dalles, Oregon
Radio stations established in 1985
1985 establishments in Oregon